George Daniels Watkins (born 28 April 1924, Evanston, Illinois) is an American solid-state physicist.

Watkins received in 1943 his bachelor's degree in physics from Randolph-Macon College and in 1947 his master's degree and in 1952 his Ph.D. from Harvard University with thesis A R. F. Spectrometer with Applications to Studies of Nuclear Magnetic Resonance Absorption in Solids. From 1952 to 1975 he did research in solid state physics at the General Electric Research Laboratory in Schenectady, New York. During his time at General Electric, he was also an adjunct professor at Rensselaer Polytechnic Institute from 1962 to 1965 and at the State University of New York, Albany from 1969 to 1973. From 1975 until his retirement in 1996, he was "Sherman Fairchild Professor for Physics'" at Lehigh University.

Watkins has done research on "the physics of defects in solids, radiation damage, electronic structure of deep levels in semiconductors, nuclear and electron paramagnetic resonance, optical spectroscopy, optical detection of magnetic resonance, and deep level transient capacitance spectroscopy of point defects in solids." His research focused on defects in semiconductors (including defects caused by radiation) and exploration of such defects with magnetic resonance techniques (electron spin resonance and electron nuclear double resonance).

In 1966/67 he was a visiting scientist at the University of Oxford (Clarendon Laboratory) as a Fellow of the National Science Foundation and in 1983/84 at the Max Planck Institute for Solid State Research in Stuttgart as U.S. Senior Scientist of the Alexander von Humboldt Foundation. In 1990/91 he was a visiting professor for three months each at the University of Lund, King's College London, and Fraunhofer Institute for Applied Solid State Physics (Fraunhofer-Institut für Angewandte Festkörperphysik — IAF) in Freiburg im Breisgau.

In 1978 Watkins received the Oliver E. Buckley Condensed Matter Prize. In 1988 he was elected a member of the National Academy of Sciences. In 1999 he received the silver medal in Physics (Materials Science) of the International ESR/EPR Society.

He married in 1949 and is the father of three children.

References

External links
 George D. Watkins's homepage at Lehigh University

1924 births
Living people
21st-century American physicists
Lehigh University faculty
Randolph–Macon College alumni
Harvard University alumni
Oliver E. Buckley Condensed Matter Prize winners
20th-century American physicists
Fellows of the American Physical Society
American expatriates in the United Kingdom